At the Stroke of Nine is a 1957 British crime film directed by Lance Comfort and starring Patricia Dainton, Stephen Murray, Patrick Barr and Dermot Walsh. The plot follows a high-flying female journalist who is kidnapped by a madman. He forces her to write articles about him and threatens to kill her.

Cast
 Patricia Dainton - Sally Bryant
 Stephen Murray - Stephen Garrett
 Patrick Barr - Frank
 Dermot Walsh - MacDonnell
 Clifford Evans - Inspector Hudgell
 Leonard White - Thompson
 Reginald Green - Toby
 Alexander Doré - Carter
 Leonard Sharp - News Vendor
 Robert Hartley - Westcott
 Frank Atkinson - Porter
 William Moore - Campion
 Marianne Stone - Secretary
 George Lee - Young Reporter
 William Hepper - Clerk
 Donald B. Edwards - Gray

Reception
TV Guide wrote, "the frantic search for the loonie by police offers some interesting scenes with fair suspense."

References

External links
 

1957 films
1950s English-language films
Films directed by Lance Comfort
1957 crime films
British crime films
1950s British films